Omar David Bencomo Lamas (born February 10, 1989) is a Venezuelan professional baseball pitcher who is currently a free agent. He was signed by the Tampa Bay Rays in 2007 as an undrafted free agent.

Career

Tampa Bay Rays
Bencomo signed with the Tampa Bay Rays as an undrafted free agent on January 29, 2007. He made his professional debut with the VSL Devil Rays, and played for the club in 2008 as well. In 2009, he played for the rookie ball Princeton Rays, pitching to a 2-1 record and 3.47 ERA in 9 appearances. He spent the 2010 season in Low-A with the Hudson Valley Renegades, recording a 1-3 record and 4.60 ERA with 41 strikeouts. In 2011, he played for the Single-A Bowling Green Hot Rods, registering a 4-5 record and 3.97 ERA in 38 games. He became a free agent after the 2011 season. Bencomo did not play in affiliated ball in 2012 and played only in the Venezuelan Winter League in 2013 and 2014

Wichita Wingnuts
On December 8, 2014, Bencomo signed with the Wichita Wingnuts of the American Association of Independent Professional Baseball for the 2015 season. Bencomo pitched to a 4-1 record and 3.81 ERA in 9 appearances for Wichita.

Laredo Lemurs
On June 4, 2015, Bencomo was traded to the Laredo Lemurs of the American Association of Professional Baseball in exchange for Matt Padgett. He recorded a 2-0 record and 1.93 ERA in 4 games for Laredo, including a victory against his former team.

Minnesota Twins
On August 7, 2015, Bencomo signed a minor league contract with the Minnesota Twins organization. He finished the season with the High-A Fort Myers Miracle, and recorded a 1.50 ERA in 3 games. In 2016, Bencomo split the year between the Triple-A Rochester Red Wings and the Double-A Chattanooga Lookouts, registering a 7-7 record and 3.74 ERA between the two teams. On November 7, 2016, he elected free agency.

Miami Marlins
On February 8, 2017, Bencomo signed a minor league contract with the Miami Marlins organization and was selected as a member of the Venezuela national baseball team at the 2017 World Baseball Classic. He split the season between the Triple-A New Orleans Baby Cakes and the Double-A Jacksonville Jumbo Shrimp, pitching to a 5-6 record and 4.95 ERA in 22 appearances. On November 6, 2017, he elected free agency.

Minnesota Twins (second stint)
On January 19, 2018, Bencomo signed a minor league deal to return to the Minnesota Twins organization. He split the season between Triple-A Rochester and Double-A Chattanooga, accumulating a 9-6 record and 3.45 ERA between the two teams. On November 2, 2018, he elected free agency.

Baltimore Orioles
On January 19, 2019, Bencomo signed a minor league contract with the Baltimore Orioles organization. He was released prior to the season on March 20, 2019.

Tecolotes de los Dos Laredos
On April 3, 2019, Bencomo signed with the Tecolotes de los Dos Laredos of the Mexican League. On April 18, Bencomo was released after registering a 6.97 ERA in 2 games.

Sultanes de Monterrey
On April 22, 2019, Bencomo signed with the Sultanes de Monterrey of the Mexican League. In 11 games for Monterrey, Bencomo pitched to a 3-2 record and 4.87 ERA.

Bravos de León
On July 2, 2019, Bencomo was traded to the Bravos de León. Bencomo was released on July 29 after 3 games of 2.93 ERA ball.

Sugar Land Skeeters
On February 19, 2020, Bencomo signed with the Sugar Land Skeeters of the Atlantic League of Professional Baseball. He did not play a game for the team due to the cancellation of the ALPB season because of the COVID-19 pandemic and became a free agent after the year.

References

External links

1989 births
Living people
Bowling Green Hot Rods players
Bravos de León players
Bravos de Margarita players
Chattanooga Lookouts players
Fort Myers Miracle players
Hudson Valley Renegades players
Jacksonville Jumbo Shrimp players
Laredo Lemurs players
Mexican League baseball pitchers
New Orleans Baby Cakes players
Princeton Rays players
Rochester Red Wings players
Sportspeople from Valencia, Venezuela
Sultanes de Monterrey players
Tecolotes de los Dos Laredos players
Venezuelan expatriate baseball players in Mexico
Venezuelan expatriate baseball players in the United States
Venezuelan Summer League Devil Rays/Reds players
Venezuelan Summer League Rays players
Wichita Wingnuts players
World Baseball Classic players of Venezuela
2017 World Baseball Classic players